The 201st Security Division, originally the 201st Security Brigade, was a German Army rear-area security division of World War II. The unit was deployed in German-occupied areas of the Soviet Union, and was responsible for large-scale war crimes and atrocities including the deaths of thousands of Soviet civilians. It was disbanded in January 1945

Operational history

Formation
The division was formed in June 1942 on the basis of the 201st Security Brigade. The brigade had been deployed on the Eastern Front during Operation Barbarossa, the 1941 invasion of the Soviet Union, and operated in the occupied regions of the Soviet Union behind Army Group Centre's front lines. While a brigade the unit participated in the murder of Jewish civilians alongside Einsatzkommando 9 of Einsatzgruppe B.

Operations
Upon formation, the division operated in the Vitebsk-Polotsk region of the north-western Belarus. Its duties included security of communications and supply lines, economic exploitation and combatting (partisans) in the Wehrmacht's rear areas. The so-called anti-partisan operations in "bandit-infested" areas amounted to the destruction of villages, seizure of livestock, deportation of the able-bodied population for slave labour to Germany, and the murder of those of non-working age.

In September 1942 the division reported killing 864 "partisans in combat" and handed over 245 individuals to the Wehrmacht's Secret Field Police for execution, while suffering 8 dead and 25 wounded itself. Only 99 weapons (rifles, machine-guns and pistols) were seized. In early 1943, the division carried out operations Schneehase, Kugelblitz and Donnerkeil, which resulted in the death of 2,737 "bandits". In the same period, the unit reported 109 German troops killed in action.

The division was sent to front-line duty in February 1943. The unit was largely destroyed during the Soviet Red Army summer offensive Operation Bagration in 1944, with only the staff and supply troops retreating north. In August 1944, it returned to rear-area security operations and spent the rest of its existence in the rear area of the Army Group North. It was disbanded in January 1945.

See also
War crimes of the Wehrmacht

References

Citations

Bibliography

Further reading

Military units and formations established in 1941
Security units of Nazi Germany established in 1941
1941 establishments in Germany
Military units and formations disestablished in 1945
Security divisions of Germany during World War II
War crimes of the Wehrmacht